The Cacheu River Mangroves Natural Park is a national park situated on the Cacheu River in Guinea-Bissau. It was established on 1 December 2000. This site is 886 km. The park has been designated as a Ramsar site since 2015.

The park is considered to be the largest compact mangrove environment in West Africa, as much as 68% of the territory is covered with mangroves.

Under the protection of mangroves, the reproduction of fishing resources and the preservation of the diversity of flora and fauna are ensured. The park provides a home for many migratory birds in the region.

Climate change

In 2022, the IPCC Sixth Assessment Report included Cacheu River Mangroves Natural Park in the list of African natural heritage sites which would be threatened by flooding and coastal erosion by the end of the century, but only if climate change followed RCP 8.5, which is the scenario of high and continually increasing greenhouse gas emissions associated with the warming of over 4°C., and is no longer considered very likely. The other, more plausible scenarios result in lower warming levels and consequently lower sea level rise: yet, sea levels would continue to increase for about 10,000 years under all of them. Even if the warming is limited to 1.5°C, global sea level rise is still expected to exceed  after 2000 years (and higher warming levels will see larger increases by then), consequently exceeding 2100 levels of sea level rise under RCP 8.5 (~ with a range of ) well before the year 4000.

External links
 APES MAPPER

References

Cacheu Region
National parks of Guinea-Bissau
Protected areas established in 2000
Ramsar sites in Guinea-Bissau